John Swann may refer to:
John Swann (politician) (1760–1793), American planter and Continental Congressman for North Carolina
John Swann (cricketer) (1926–2011), English cricketer and footballer
John Swann (soccer) (born 1979), American soccer (football) player
John Swann (tennis), Canadian tennis player in 1960 U.S. National Championships – Men's Singles
Jack Swann (1893–1990), English footballer
John Swann (pirate), 17th-century pirate active near Madagascar

See also
John Swan (disambiguation)